Pyramidella elenensis is a species of sea snail, a marine gastropod mollusk in the family Pyramidellidae, the pyrams and their allies.

Description
The shell grows to a length of  9 mm.

Distribution
This species occurs in the Pacific Ocean off Ecuador.

References

External links
 To USNM Invertebrate Zoology Mollusca Collection
 To World Register of Marine Species
 

Pyramidellidae
Gastropods described in 1924